Lacroix-Falgarde is a commune in the Haute-Garonne department in southwestern France.

Population

See also
Communes of the Haute-Garonne department

Transportation
Residents and visitors can use the on-demand transportation line 119 (TAD 119) operated by Tisseo.

References

Communes of Haute-Garonne